ο Tauri, Latinized as Omicron Tauri, is a binary star system in the constellation Taurus, near the constellation border with Cetus. It has a yellow hue and is visible to the naked eye with an apparent visual magnitude of 3.61. It is approximately 191 light years from the Sun based on parallax, but is drifting closer with a radial velocity of −20 km/s. This system has the Flamsteed designation 1 Tauri; Omicron Tauri is the Bayer designation.

The visible component is an aging G-type giant with a stellar classification of G6 III. This star has three times the mass of the Sun and eighteen times the Sun's radius. Based on the latter, interferometry-measured radius, it is rotating once every 533 days. It is radiating 149 times the luminosity of the Sun from its photosphere at an effective temperature of 5,180 K.

References

External links

G-type giants
Spectroscopic binaries

Taurus (constellation)
Tauri, Omicron
Durchmusterung objects
Tauri, 001
021120
015900
1030